J. Peter Neary  (11 February 1950 – 16 June 2021) was an economist specialising in international trade. He was professor of economics at Oxford University, and a professorial fellow of Merton College, Oxford, as well as associate member of Nuffield College, Oxford. He was previously professor of political economy at University College Dublin, from 1980 to 2006. He was also a research fellow of the Centre for Economic Policy Research.

Neary was born in Drogheda, Ireland, and educated at University College Dublin and Oxford, where he completed his D.Phil. in 1978. He was an editor of the European Economic Review (1986–1990) and served on a number of other editorial boards. He was president of the Irish Economic Association (1990–92), and president of the European Economic Association in 2002. He was elected to the British Academy in 2008, and was a member of the Royal Irish Academy from 1997. He gained an entry in Who's Who in 2008.

Neary, together with W. Max Corden, in 1982 developed the classic economic model describing Dutch disease.

Selected bibliography

Books

Journal articles

References

External links
 Merton College profile page
 List of publications

Trade economists
20th-century Irish economists
People from Drogheda
Fellows of the British Academy
Fellows of Merton College, Oxford
Fellows of the Econometric Society
Members of the Royal Irish Academy
Alumni of the University of Oxford
Alumni of University College Dublin
1950 births
2021 deaths
Fellows of the European Economic Association
21st-century Irish economists